A business college is a school that provides education above the high school level but could not be compared to that of a traditional university or college.  Unlike universities and even junior and community colleges, business colleges typically train the student for a specific vocational aspect, usually clerical tasks such as typing, stenography or simple bookkeeping. Proprietary schools can be traced back as far as 1636 to the puritans of Massachusetts. They served as a trade school for both business and necessary skills, from shipbuilding to sewing.

The first business college founded in the United States is said to have been Nelson Business College in Cincinnati, founded by Richard Nelson in 1856. The goal of a business college is not to provide a thorough education, as is the model of modern universities in the liberal arts fields, but rather to provide training for a very specific task, such as legal terms, marketing, strategy, planning, Human resources, management information systems, finance, or negotiation. Academic credits earned at a business college do not transfer to other colleges or universities and students cannot earn a bachelor's degree, though an associate degree may be offered. Business College's do offer degrees in business administration and management. These are typically offered through a 1-2 year program.

In recent decades the number of these institutions has been declining as business colleges have been finding more competition coming from community colleges, which provide both vocational as well as liberal arts classes and are often able to offer the classes at a lower rate of tuition, as they are usually nonprofit and subsidized by one or more levels of government assistance. Business colleges should not be confused with business schools which typically offer a Master of Business Administration (MBA) program after a student has completed a bachelor's degree. MBA programs typically take two academic years to complete.

In the US, business colleges are sometimes also called proprietary colleges, especially when they grant associate degrees or higher.

See also
Business and Enterprise College, a type of specialist school in England

References

External links
 Association of Proprietary Colleges